Nobody Knows is a 2020 South Korean television series starring Kim Seo-hyung, Ryu Deok-hwan, Park Hoon and Ahn Ji-ho. It aired on SBS TV from March 2 to April 21, 2020.

Ahead of the premiere, a webtoon depicting why Cha Young-jin became a detective was released on KakaoPage.

Synopsis
Still haunted by the death of her friend who was murdered 19 years ago by the infamous Stigmata serial killer, detective Cha Young-jin (Kim Seo-hyung) is determined to catch the culprit.

She soon joins school teacher Lee Sun-woo (Ryu Deok-hwan), and they do their best to protect the youth at risk, whose lives could have been changed if they had been surrounded by good adults.

Cast

Main
 Kim Seo-hyung as Cha Young-jin
 Kim Sae-ron as young Cha Young-jin
 Ryu Deok-hwan as Lee Sun-woo
 Park Hoon as Baek Sang-ho
 Ahn Ji-ho as Go Eun-ho

Supporting

Seoul Metropolitan Police Agency
 Moon Sung-keun as Hwang In-beom
 Min Jin-woong as Lee Jae-hong
 Kang Ye-won as Yoon Ja-young
 Jun Suk-chan as Kim Byung-hee
 Baek Soo-jang as Park Jin-soo
 Park Chul-min as Han Geun-man

New Life Church
 Kang Shin-il as Seo Sang-won
 Kwon Hae-hyo as Jang Ki-ho
 Baek Hyun-joo as Im Hee-jung
 Jeon Moo-song as Kwon Jae-chun

Shinsung Middle School
 Jo Han-chul as Yoon Hee-seob
 Yoon Chan-young as Joo Dong-myung
 Yoon Jae-yong as Ha Min-sung

Baek Sang-ho's people
 Seo Young-joo as Kim Tae-hyung
 Shin Jae-hwi as Oh Doo-seok
 Tae Won-seok as Go Hee-dong
 Park Min-jung as Bae Sun-ah

Others
 Choi Go as Joo Han-sol
 Ahn Mi-na as Lee Sun-kyung
 Jang Young-nam as Jeong So-yeon
 Han Soo-hyun as Kim Chang-soo
 Seo Yi-sook as Soo-jung's mother
 Kim Nam-kyoon as a detective
 Kim Si-eun as Choi Soo-jung
 Ham Sung-min as Lee Young-shik's friend
 Lee Joo-young as Min-sung's mother
 Jang Jae-ho as Choi Dae-hoon
 Min Sung-wook as Kevin Jung
 Ryu Sung-rok as Lee Young-shik

Original soundtrack

Part 1

Part 2

Part 3

Part 4

Part 5

Viewership

Awards and nominations

Notes

References

External links
  
 
 

Seoul Broadcasting System television dramas
Korean-language television shows
2020 South Korean television series debuts
2020 South Korean television series endings
South Korean crime television series
South Korean mystery television series
South Korean melodrama television series
Television series by Studio S